Pastavy District is a second-level administrative subdivision (raion) of Belarus in the Vitebsk Region. The center is the town of Pastavy. Other settlements include the towns of Lyntupy and Kamai.

Notable residents 
Uladzimir Dubouka (1900 – 1976), Belarusian poet, writer and a Gulag prisoner

References

 
Districts of Vitebsk Region